In geometry, an angle is subtended by an arc, line segment or any other section of a curve when its two rays pass through the endpoints of that arc, line segment or curve section.  Conversely, the arc, line segment or curve section confined within the rays of an angle is regarded as the corresponding subtension of that angle. We also sometimes say that an arc is intercepted or enclosed by that angle.

The precise meaning varies with context.  For example, one may speak of the angle subtended by an arc of a circle when the angle's vertex is the centre of the circle.

See also 
 Central angle
 Inscribed angle

External links 
 Definition of subtended angle, mathisfun.com, with interactive applet
 How an object subtends an angle, Math Open Reference, with interactive applet
 Angle definition pages, Math Open Reference, with interactive applets that are also useful in a classroom setting.

Angle